Mohammad Shahzad (born 15 August 1979) is a Pakistani-born cricketer who played for the United Arab Emirates national cricket team. He made his One Day International (ODI) debut for the United Arab Emirates against Afghanistan in the 2014 ACC Premier League on 2 May 2014. He played his last ODI on 2 December 2014 against Afghanistan. He made his Twenty20 International debut against Scotland in the 2015 ICC World Twenty20 Qualifier tournament on 9 July 2015.

He was reported for a suspected illegal bowling action by the ICC after the second ODI against Afghanistan on 30 November in Dubai, which was cleared later by ICC on 25 May 2015.

References

External links
 

1979 births
Living people
Emirati cricketers
United Arab Emirates One Day International cricketers
United Arab Emirates Twenty20 International cricketers
Cricketers from Multan
Pakistani cricketers
Pakistani emigrants to the United Arab Emirates
Pakistani expatriate sportspeople in the United Arab Emirates